Palyanytsya is a type of Ukrainian hearth-baked bread, made mostly of wheat flour in a home oven. The yeast hearth bread has a semi-circular cut across the top third of the loaf.

Etymology 
This is because, when baking the bread, the raised crust can sometimes be burned. In the 19th century, the Russians used similar names. Another version is based on the assumption that pOlianytsia is a traditional bread produced by the Polans an early medieval tribe of Eastern Slavs.

Recipe 
Traditional palyanytsya was baked from yeast dough. First, hops were boiled in a pot, which was then poured into a makitra, to which sifted wheat flour was added. The resulting dough was kneaded, covered with a makitra and left to cool. Yeast or sourdough was added to the cooled dough and placed in an unheated oven overnight. In the morning, the dough that had already risen was kneaded with wheat flour, and warm water and salt were added. The dough was then kneaded at night until it stopped sticking to the baker's hands. After that, the dough was divided into pieces, which were then rolled out on the table. The resulting bread was placed in the oven on a wooden shovel, sprinkled with flour or steamed cabbage leaf. Finally, an incision was made in the bread to allow it to rise further when baked. 

According to GOST 12793-77, the bakeries of the USSR produced a standardized "Ukrainian palyanytsya" baked in molds. It had a mass of 750g-1kg, with a lateral cut of 3/4 of a circle.

Symbolism 
In Christianity, palyanytsya, like bread in general, symbolizes happiness and can represent well-being, the body of God, affection, hospitality and security. Palyanytsya can also be interpreted as a symbol of the sun.

According to popular belief, you should not eat a piece of palyanytsya after another person, as doing so will take away their happiness. It is also unlucky to leave a piece uneaten; and eating bread behind another person's back will "eat" their strength.

Other uses 
The word palyanytsya is used as an important shibboleth test in the Ukrainian language, to identify people for whom the Ukrainian language is not phonetically familiar. When captured, some Russians have claimed they are Ukrainian.  Instead of pronouncing it "palianytsia", Russian speakers usually replace the Ukrainian sound и (y) with і (i), and the Ukrainian я (ya) with а (a),, thus sounding more like "palianitsa". The second mistake is the most widespread because the phoneme represented by the letter ц (ts) in Russian is never palatalized, unlike in Ukrainian. During the 2022 Russian invasion of Ukraine, the word became one of those used to identify Russian soldiers or saboteurs.

See also 

 Korovai
 Knish

References 

Sourdough breads
National symbols of Ukraine
2022 Russian invasion of Ukraine in popular culture
Yeast breads
Wheat breads
Ukrainian breads